Vidyanagar railway station is a railway station in Hyderabad, Telangana, India. Localities like Shanker Mutt, RTC X Roads, Chikkadpally, Shivam Road, Tilaknagar, Adikmet, DD Colony,CE colony,new Nallakunta, Bagh Amberpet Nallakunta and Amberpet are accessible from this station.

Lines
Hyderabad Multi-Modal Transport System
Secunderabad–Falaknuma route (SF Line)

References

External links
MMTS Timings as per South Central Railway

MMTS stations in Hyderabad
Hyderabad railway division